was a village located in Inba District, Chiba Prefecture, Japan.

Motono Village was created on April 1, 1914 through the merger of Hongo and Yawara Villages. The development of Chiba New Town greatly accelerated the development of the village, which became a bedroom community for Chiba.

As of February 2011, the village had an estimated population of 9,055 and a density of 382 persons per km2. The total area was 23.72 km2.

On March 23, 2010, Motono, along with the village of Inba (also from Inba District), was merged into the expanded city of Inzai.

External links
 Inzai official website 

Dissolved municipalities of Chiba Prefecture
Inzai